Trond Fredriksen (born 21 May 1977 in Ålesund) is a football coach and former Norwegian footballer. He is a former football midfielder and former manager for Aalesunds FK.

Career statistics

References

External links
 Guardian Football

1977 births
Living people
Sportspeople from Ålesund
Association football midfielders
Norwegian footballers
Aalesunds FK players
Norwegian First Division players
Eliteserien players
Norwegian football managers
Aalesunds FK managers
Ullensaker/Kisa IL managers
Eliteserien managers